St. Antönien Ascharina is a former municipality in the Swiss canton of Graubünden. Until 1953, the municipality was known as Ascharina.

The municipalities of St. Antönien Ascharina and St. Antönien have voted with a large majority to combine the two municipalities, effective January 1, 2007.

The municipality is German-speaking.

References

Luzein
Villages in Graubünden
Former municipalities of Graubünden